The National Society United States Daughters of 1812 is an association of female descendants of veterans of the War of 1812.  It was established on January 8, 1892 as the United States Daughters of 1812 in  New York City.

The United States Daughters of 1812 is a non-profit, women's organization based in Washington, D.C., dedicated to serving the "fraternal interests [of] women whose lineal ancestors served in the civil government, the army or the navy of the United States" between 1784 and 1815. It is a "volunteer women's service organization dedicated to promoting patriotism, preserving and increasing knowledge of the history of the American people" and is active in commemorating significant events from the time period of the War of 1812 such as the Battle of New Orleans.

Its headquarters at 1461 Rhode Island Avenue in Washington, D.C., the United States Daughters of 1812, National Headquarters was purchased in 1928 and is listed on the National Register of Historic Places.

Notable people 
 Ann Turner Dillon, lineage society leader
 Clara L. Brown Dyer (1849–1931), artist; founder of the branch in Maine
 Lynn Forney Young, lineage society leader

See also 
 The Eighth
 General Society of the War of 1812

References

Further reading 
 New York Public Library. New York World's Fair 1939–1940 records. Photo of delegates from the U.S. Daughters of 1812 at the 1939 New York World's Fair, 1939–1940

External links 

 

501(c)(3) organizations
1892 establishments in Ohio
Aftermath of the War of 1812 in the United States
History of women in the United States
Lineage societies
Nonpartisan organizations in the United States
Non-profit organizations based in Washington, D.C.
Organizations established in 1892
Women's organizations based in the United States
Women's clubs in the United States